Aristomenis Kontogouris (1841–1904) was a Greek MP for Achaia and a mayor of Patras.

Kontogouris was born in Patras and was the son of Stylianos Kontogouris, relative of the famous rich family in Patras. He studied law in Athens, Berlin, and in Paris. He was elected MP in 1873, 1879, 1881, and 1885 and he was also a Minister of Justice. He became mayor of Patras from 1891 until 1895.  He was a mayoral candidate but lost the 1888 election, he was supported by Achilleas Gerokostopoulos in the 1890 elections and he defeated the industrialist Gerasimos Kogkos. In his years in the military, he ran the city's philharmonic company.

Kontogouris died in 1904. He was survived by his wife Viktoria Sisini, daughter of Chrysanthos Sisinis.

References

The first version of the article is translated and is based from the article at the Greek Wikipedia (el:Main Page)

1841 births
1904 deaths
Mayors of Patras
Politicians from Patras
Greek MPs 1873–1874
Greek MPs 1879–1881
Greek MPs 1881–1885
Greek MPs 1885–1887
Greek MPs 1887–1890
Greek MPs 1890–1892